Cassiope mertensiana is a species of flowering plant known by the common names western moss heather and white mountain heather.

This heather is native to subalpine areas of western North America, from Alaska to the mountains of California. It is a small, branching shrub which forms patches along the ground and in rocky crevices.

Description
Cassiope mertensiana has short, erect, snakelike stems that are covered in tiny leathery scalelike leaves only a few millimeters long. From between the layers of scale leaves emerge reddish  pedicels each bearing a petite, hanging, down-facing, bell-shaped flower. The bractlets are red and the contrasting flower is white.

Although the shrub tends to grow in areas where there is a lot of accumulation of snow, adequate rain precipitation is needed for the continued growth of Cassiope Mertensiana. The shrub must be exposed to enough sunlight and warmer conditions for proper growth during the growing season.

References

Lini, A., & Berg, D. L. (2012, May 25). THE DENDROCLIMATOLOGICAL POTENTIAL OF AN ALPINE SHRUB, CASSIOPE MERTENSIANA, FROM MOUNT RAINIER, WA, USA. Retrieved March 3, 2020, from http://onlinelibrary.wiley.com/doi/10.1111/j.1468-0459.2012.00463.x/abstract

External links

Jepson Manual Treatment: Cassiope mertensiana
USDA Plants Profile
Cassiope mertensiana — U.C. Photo gallery

Ericaceae
Flora of Alaska
Flora of Western Canada
Flora of the Northwestern United States
Flora of California
Flora of the Sierra Nevada (United States)
Flora of Subarctic America
Flora without expected TNC conservation status